Rusty Nails (Rusty Osgood, born 1966) is an American director, writer, producer, and actor. He is best known for his feature-length B-movie Acne. Nails has also made several short films, including God is Dad, The Ramones and I, Grethel and Hansel, Animated Corpse, and Santiago vs. Wigface, which won a special recognition award.

Biography

Early life and punk rock career
Rusty Nails grew up in a suburb of Boston, Massachusetts and was active in Boston's punk scene.  Exposed to B-movie through the local television program Creature Double Feature, Nails became obsessed with old horror films.   He made his first foray into the genre in the 1980s with his punk rock band, The Creeps, for whom he sang and about such subjects as teenage violence ("On TV") and being turned into a zombie by a virulent strain of pimples ("Acne").  Nails released music by The Creeps on his own label, Wasted Effort Records, along with other local bands like fellow punkers The Angry Kids, the busker street-pop duo Egg (whose members left to join Caroliner Rainbow and found The Presidents of the United States of America), and post-hardbore band Cabal for whom Nails also played bass.

Nails also worked as an amateur photographer and publisher, writing and contributing to numerous fanzines, and supported political causes, especially anti-racism and animal rights.  Many of his lyrics he wrote for both The Creeps and Cabal reflected these values, and Wasted Effort's releases often contained information and literature from groups like People for the Ethical Treatment of Animals.

Film career
In 1991 Nails moved to Chicago to study film at Columbia College and produce several short films.  He extended his stay at Colombia by several years in order to complete his first feature-length work, Acne (whose title song is performed by Nails' old punk band), a black-and-white horror film about a pair of teenagers who wake up to find themselves mutated into horribly strange creatures.  Nails spent five years and $12,000 on the film, raising funds through yard sales and paying no one but the film's make-up artist $225 to create the giant volcanic pustules for which the film was named.

Nails has made various cameo appearances in print, television and film, often under a pseudonym.  His likeness has been published in the Weekly World News and he was a guest on both Ricki Lake and The Morton Downey Jr. Show.  In later years, Nails focused his attention toward documentary filmmaking, focusing on acts of teen violence and cult filmmakers, including George Romero.

Nails supports his work through his film company, New Eye Films, and  runs the Movieside Film Festival in Chicago.

Filmography

Director
 2008 Dead On: The Life and Cinema of George A. Romero - Director
 2002 God Is Dad - Director / Writer
 2002 The Ramones and I - Director / Writer
 2000 Acne - Director / Writer
 2000 Santiago vs. Wigface - Director / Writer
 2000 Animated Corpse - Director / Writer
 2000 Grethel & Hansel - Director / Writer
 2000 Blood Drinkers - Director / Writer

Acting Credits
 2011 Fancypants as Ambulance Onlooker (uncredited)
 2009 Smash Cut as Fred Sandy's Assistant
 2003 Skunk Ape!? (short) as Zuffy Dortch, The Cryptozoologist
 2000 Citizen Toxie: The Toxic Avenger IV as Kabukiman's Drinking Buddy (as Rusty Osgood)
 1999 Terror Firmer as Frat Guy Who Offers Armpit (as Rusty Osgood)
 1999 Acne as Zooey

Appearances as Himself
 2006 American Stag
 2004 Film School

References

External links

Imagine article from Velocity Magazine
Tastes Like Chicken Interview
E Splatter Interview

1966 births
Living people
American film directors
American photographers
American punk rock musicians
Musicians from Massachusetts
Columbia College Chicago alumni
American male actors